Weymouth railway station is the main railway station serving the town of Weymouth, Dorset, England (the other being Upwey station which is located north of the town centre).

History

The Wilts, Somerset and Weymouth Railway, which was authorised in 1845, was built in stages (during which the company was absorbed in 1850 by the Great Western Railway). The LSWR was granted running powers from Dorchester to Weymouth, where some of the platforms were dedicated for LSWR use; these powers were exercised from the opening day. The station was named Weymouth, although some timetables showed it as Weymouth Town. Branches to Portland and Weymouth Quay (both opened in 1865) ran from Weymouth Junction, just north of the station.

The original station buildings were designed by T. H. Bertram and constructed in timber with a glazed overall roof across the tracks; this was removed after WW2. By the turn of the century the station area comprised five platforms, a large goods yard, and a small LSWR engine shed; the GWR had a larger shed situated north of the station. Nearby, Melcombe Regis served Portland passenger trains until 1952 and provided an overflow platform for excursion trains on busy summer weekends until 1959.

After the Second World War, the station saw rapid growth in holiday and Channel Islands traffic. As a result, the station underwent a major expansion in the late 1950s, gaining two lengthy excursion platforms (which now serve today's station), additional sidings adjacent to Jubilee Gardens, and a new signal box to replace two older boxes. However traffic soon declined and the station was progressively rationalised after the end of steam-hauled operations in 1967 with the goods yard closing in 1972 and the signal box and most of the remaining sidings being taken out of use in 1987. Although the current station is a mere shadow of its former self, the extension of third-rail electrification from Bournemouth in 1988 has given the station much improved services to London.

The station and forecourt were reconstructed at a cost of £750,000 and formally opened on 3 July 1986 by the Mayor of Weymouth and Portland, Councillor David Hall, who unveiled a commemorative plaque in the ticket hall. The station, which was rebuilt in Network SouthEast livery, was provided with enhanced ticket office facilities, a travel centre, Red Star Parcels point and an improved car park. In its final years, the old Weymouth station was far too big for the traffic it was handling.

In 2022 the area outside the station was rebuilt. The work included the installation of a new bus stop.

Accidents and incidents 
On 4 August 1868, a passenger train collided with the buffer stops at Weymouth due to poor rail conditions and driver error. Six people were injured.

Services

Services at Weymouth are operated by South Western Railway and Great Western Railway.

The second is a semi-fast service calling at principal stations only to Winchester, then  and London Waterloo. On Sundays, the service is reduced to hourly.

On Sundays, this is reduced to between three and five trains per day depending on the time of year.

Weymouth Quay

Weymouth Quay railway station is a disused terminus in the town. Its passenger station was used solely for trains connecting with cross-channel ferries, which have not run since 1987. Its use had been suggested as part of the transport infrastructure for the 2012 Olympic sailing events to take place on the Isle of Portland, though since it is accessed via the Weymouth Harbour Tramway, which ran along public streets, this posed difficulties. Previously, the branch saw both freight and passenger traffic, most recently fuel-oil trains.  The tracks through the streets were removed October-December 2020, save for a couple of short sections to show the former track alignment.

References

Bibliography

External links

Railway stations in Dorset
Railway station
Railway stations in Great Britain opened in 1857
Former Great Western Railway stations
Railway stations served by Great Western Railway
Railway stations served by South Western Railway
1857 establishments in England
DfT Category C1 stations